

Final standings

ACC tournament
See 1959 ACC men's basketball tournament

NCAA tournament

Round of 23
Navy 76, North Carolina 63

NCAA record
0–1

NIT
League rules prevented ACC teams from playing in the NIT, 1954–1966

External links
 https://web.archive.org/web/19990902032914/http://www.sportsstats.com/bball/standings/1959